"Hey Little Boy" is a rock song by Australian band Divinyls, released as the second single from their 1988 album Temperamental. It is a cover version of the 1966 song "Little Girl" by American rock 'n' roll band Syndicate of Sound. However, when Divinyls recorded their version of the song, they had the gender roles reversed. It peaked at number twenty-three on the Australian singles chart and spent twelve weeks in the top fifty.

Track listing

Australian 7" single
 "Hey Little Boy" - 3:21
 "Para-Dice" - 3:53 (song appears on Divinyls previous album ''What a Life!)

U.S. 7" single
 "Hey Little Boy" (Edit)
 "Fighting"

U.S. 12" Promo Single
 "Hey Little Boy"
 "Hey Little Boy" (Bob Clearmountain Mix)

Chart performance

"Hey Little Boy" proved to be Divinyls first charting single on the newly instituted ARIA Charts. Previously the Kent Music Report was Australia's leading music chart system and the band's previous single "Back to the Wall" had peaked at number thirty-three on that chart. "Hey Little Boy" peaked at number twenty-three and spent twelve weeks in the top fifty.

Charts

References

1988 singles
Divinyls songs
Song recordings produced by Mike Chapman
1988 songs
Chrysalis Records singles